Polyphosphate-accumulating organisms (PAOs) are a group of bacteria that, under certain conditions, facilitate the removal of large amounts of phosphorus from wastewater in a process, called enhanced biological phosphorus removal (EBPR). PAOs accomplish this removal of phosphate by accumulating it within their cells as polyphosphate.
PAOs are by no means the only bacteria that can accumulate polyphosphate within their cells and in fact, the production of polyphosphate is a widespread ability among bacteria.  However, the PAOs have many characteristics that other organisms that accumulate polyphosphate do not have, that make them amenable to use in wastewater treatment.  Specifically, this is the ability to consume simple carbon compounds (energy source) without the presence of an external electron acceptor (such as nitrate or oxygen) by generating energy from internally stored polyphosphate and glycogen.  Most other bacteria cannot consume under these conditions and therefore PAOs gain a selective advantage within the mixed microbial community present in the activated sludge. Therefore, wastewater treatment plants that operate for enhanced biological phosphorus removal have an anaerobic tank (where there is no nitrate or oxygen present as external electron acceptor) prior to the other tanks to give PAOs preferential access to the simple carbon compounds in the wastewater that is influent to the plant.

A PAO related to the Betaproteobacteria has been identified and named Candidatus Accumulibacter Phosphatis.  Accumulibacter has been shown to remove phosphorus from EBPR plants in Australia, Europe and the USA. It can consume a range of carbon compounds, such as acetate and propionate, under anaerobic conditions and store these compounds as polyhydroxyalkanoates (PHA) which it consumes as a carbon and energy source for growth using oxygen or nitrate as electron acceptor.

Recently, another PAO related to the Actinobacteria has been identified in wastewater treatment plants. These organisms appear to be limited to certain amino acids as carbon and energy source.  The storage compound that they use to store the amino acids that these organisms take up under anaerobic conditions has not been identified. These bacteria have been observed in some EBPR plants in Denmark (where they were discovered) but their wider distribution is unknown.

References

Biotechnology
Waste treatment technology
Bacteriology
Phosphorus